Tim Z. Hernandez is an American writer, poet, and performer. His first poetry  collection, Skin Tax  (Heyday, 2004), received the 2006 American Book Award, and his debut novel, Breathing, in Dust (Texas Tech University Press, 2010), was awarded the 2010 Premio Aztlán Literary Prize, and was a finalist for the California Book Award. In 2011, Hernandez was named one of sixteen New American Poets by the Poetry Society of America. In 2014 he received the Colorado Book Award for his poetry collection, Natural Takeover of Small Things, and the 2014 International Latino Book Award for his historical fiction novel, Mañana Means Heaven. In 2018, he received the Luis Leal Award for Distinction in Chicano Letters administered by UC Santa Barbara, and in 2019 he was inducted into the Texas Institute of Letters.

Hernandez's research of the 1948 Los Gatos DC-3 crash near Los Gatos, California which killed 32 people, primarily Mexican farm laborers, resulted in his successful campaign to install a monument at the mass grave site. In 2017, he published the book, All They Will Call You, on the crash and the subsequent investigation. Hernandez was one of four finalists for the inaugural Freedom Plow Award from the Split This Rock Foundation for his work on locating the victims of the plane wreck at Los Gatos.

Early life
Born in Dinuba, California, Hernandez was raised in the San Joaquin Valley of Central California, where he lived in predominantly farm-worker communities in the agricultural region. His family roots are in Texas, New Mexico, and East Los Angeles. Early in his life, Hernandez's parents were migrant farmworkers, following the seasons across the southwest. It was during this time on the road that he developed an interest in travel and stories.

In his adolescent years, Hernandez was immersed in acting and visual arts. As a teenager, he focused mainly on painting. He met the artist Joseph De La Cruz in 1990 and began his first apprenticeship at the age of 16. In 1999, he apprenticed with Bay Area muralist Juana Alicia on a traditional fresco mural located at the San Francisco International Airport.

In the mid 1990s Hernandez studied poetry and performance at CSU Long Beach under the tutelage of Juan Felipe Herrera. Here he also studied with poets, June Jordan, Li Young Lee, and performance artists such Guillermo Gomez-Pena, and Commedia dell'arte.

He earned his B.A. degree in Writing & Literature from the first accredited Buddhist institute in the west, Naropa University. He holds an M.F.A. in Writing & Literature from Bennington College in Vermont. He is currently an Associate Professor at the University of Texas El Paso's Bilingual M.F.A. Creative Writing program.

Career
Hernandez's performances have been featured at the Getty Center, Denver Center for the Performing Arts, Dixon Experimental Theater in NYC, The Loft Literary Center, Intersection for the Arts, Stanford University, and at the Jack Kerouac School, among other venues. In 2000 he was commissioned by the United Way of Greater Los Angeles and the National Fanny Mae Foundation to write and perform an original one-man show on homelessness and poverty.  From 2006 through 2011 he has worked with Poets & Writers Inc. and the California Center for the Book at UCLA, offering writing workshops to marginalized communities across the state of California.

In March 2013, NPR hosted Hernandez, in regards to a new rendition of the song Deportee (Plane Wreck at Los Gatos). With the help of Lance Canales, whose parents were also migrant farmworkers, the two released a version of the song that included the names of those who perished in the 1948 Los Gatos plane crash. After months of research, Hernandez was able to discover the identities of these people within the Fresno County Hall of Records, in Fresno, CA. As stated by Hernandez, within this interview,

Later in 2013, Hernandez's research of the 1948 Los Gatos plane crash culminated in his successful drive to provide a proper monument at the mass grave of the 28 migrant farmworkers who perished nearly nameless, which had inspired the song Deportee (Plane Wreck at Los Gatos).  He has since published a related non-fiction book, All They Will Call You.

Awards
 2014 Colorado Book Award, Poetry for "Natural Takeover of Small Things"
 2014 International Latino Book Award, Historical Fiction for "Mañana Means Heaven"
 2013 Split this Rock Freedom Plow Award for Poetry & Activism, Finalist
 2011 New American Poets honor, Poetry Society of America
 2011 El Premio Aztlan Literary Prize for Breathing, In Dust
 2006 American Book Award for Skin Tax
 2006 Zora Neal Hurston Award for Skin Tax
 2003 James Duval Phelan Award, San Francisco Foundation, "Skin Tax"
 2010 California Book Award Finalist, "Breathing, In Dust"

Works

Non-Fiction

 All They Will Call You (Documentary Novel, University of Arizona Press, 2017)

Fiction

 Mañana Means Heaven (Historical Fiction, University of Arizona Press, 2013)
 Breathing, In Dust (Fiction, Texas Tech University Press, 2010)

Poetry

 Natural Takeover of Small Things (University of Arizona Press, 2013)
 )
 Culture of Flow, (Monkey Puzzle Press, 2012)

Audio CD

 Chile Con Karma: A Brown Lotus Project (Audio CD, recorded at Naropa University studios, 2007)
 The Central Chakrah Project: A Spoken Word Cura, (Audio CD, Arte Americas, 2000)

Anthologies (partial listing)

 New California Voices, Heyday Books. .
 The Devil's Punchbowl, Red Hen Press, 2010

 Border Senses (Border Senses Press)
 Wet: A Journal of Proper Bathing (University of Miami)
 Black Renaissance Noire (NYU)
 Many Mountains Moving (MMM Press)
 Undocumented: In the Gardens & the Margins (Baksun Books)
 Symposium (Baobab Tree Press)
 Square One (Colorado University)
 Mosaic Voices Anthology (Poppy Lane Publishing)
 Ram’s Tale Anthology ( Fresno City College)
 Flies, Cockroaches, and Poets Anthology ’02 (Chicano Writers & Artists Association)

References

External links
"ON THE PAGE, ON THE STAGE", Fresno Famous, sylvia savala, November 27, 2006

American male poets
Naropa University alumni
Poets from California
1974 births
Living people
People from Dinuba, California
American Book Award winners
21st-century American poets
21st-century American male writers